The 1974 All-Ireland Senior Ladies' Football Championship Final was the first All-Ireland final. It featured Tipperary and Offaly. Tipperary  won the final by 2–3 to 2–2. Towards the end of the first half, Tipperary were leading by 1–2 to 0–0. However within minutes of the restart Offaly took the lead with a goal. Tipperary came back and, with about eight minutes to go, went ahead with a point from a free. Brendan Martin, a pioneering organiser of ladies' Gaelic football in both Offaly and Dublin, provided a trophy and it was  presented to the Tipperary captain, Kitty Ryan, by the Offaly captain, Agnes O'Gorman. The trophy subsequently became known as the Brendan Martin Cup.

Route to the Final

Match info

Panels

Tipperary
Trainer John Elmer 
Selectors Tom Donovan, Teddy Keane
Players Margaret Carroll (Ardfinnan), Sally Clohessy (Moycarkey), Ann Croke (Mullinahone),  Majella Sweeney (Newcastle), Ena Hackett (Newcastle), Tina Flynn  (Ardfinnan), Betty Looby (Golden), Catherine Keane (Mullinahone), Eileen Dudley (Cashel/Golden), Susan O'Gorman (Ardfinnan), Josephine Keane (Mullinahone), Eleanor Carroll (Ardfinnan), Lillian Gorey (Killusty/St. Bridgets), Kitty Ryan (c) (Ardfinnan), Mary McGrath (Emly), Mary Power (Mullinahone), Nora Moran (Newcastle), Mary Lonergan (Emly), Mary Burke (Emly), Alice Morris (Moycarkey), Cait O'Dwyer (Moycarkey), Ann Clohessy (Moycarkey), Marian Bryan (Moycarkey), Ann Bryan (Moycarkey), G Ryan (Cappawhite), B Butler (Cappawhite), Noreen Blake (Golden), Katherine Keane (Mullinahone)

References

Ladies}
All-Ireland Senior Ladies' Football Championship Finals
Tipperary county ladies' football team matches
Offaly county ladies' football team matches
All-Ireland